William Challen (21 March 1786) was an English first-class cricketer associated with Sussex who was active in the 1810s. He is recorded in one match in 1814, totalling 3 runs with a highest score of 2.

References

English cricketers
English cricketers of 1787 to 1825
Sussex cricketers
1786 births
Year of death unknown